Episyrta is a genus of moths belonging to the family Tineidae.

Species
Episyrta coniomicta Meyrick, 1929
Episyrta protonistis Meyrick, 1930

References

Tineidae
Tineidae genera
Taxa named by Edward Meyrick